Ogami Island (大神島, Ōgami-jima) is one of the islands of the Miyako Islands. It is located about 4km north of Miyako-jima (island) and belongs to Miyakojima City. Miyakojima City was created in 2005 by a merger of many smaller towns located on the island chain. Before the merger, it belonged to Hirara City. The area is 0.24 km2, and the population is 35.

Transportation 
The island has no airport and is not connected by bridge to other nearby islands. The only way to reach the island is by boat. There are four round-trip boat rides per day.

Population 
Settlements are concentrated on the south coast of the island, near the port. There is also another settlement near the center of the island, at the highest point.

Economy 
The island's economy is based on fishing, with dried octopus being a specialty. In recent years, the islands has tried to promote tourism by setting up a tourism site.

Demographics 
The population of the islands is approximately 35 people, most of whom are elderly. The island's population is expected to decrease as residents age.

Language 
Residents speak the Ogami Dialect, a dialect of Miyakoan that is phonologically different than other Miyakoan dialects. Like Miyakoan itself, the dialect is in danger of dying out as younger residents do not speak it.

Gallery

References 

Islands of Japan
Islands of Okinawa Prefecture